Pizza Tycoon (also known as Pizza Connection in Europe) is a business simulation video game. The game was designed by the German company Cybernetic Corporation and Software 2000 in 1994, and was published by Assemble Entertainment after its re-release in 2017. It was published and adapted for the American market by MicroProse with changed artwork and locations.

Gameplay 
The game is centered on being the manager of a pizza restaurant in a town in Europe or the U.S. It gives the player the option to choose among more than thirty different characters, to create one's own pizza, have cooking contests and modify the display of the restaurant and kitchen. The player can call upon local mafia to sabotage competitor restaurants or get money from criminal activities such as weapon and drug dealing.

The game displays a playful sense of humor from the graphics and cartoonish drawings, game messages, and animated faces that are put on interacting characters. The original European version ("Pizza Connection") featured a graphical style very similar to MAD artist Don Martin. Microprose's adapted version ("Pizza Tycoon") for the American market distanced itself from this style due to copyright concerns with newly created characters in a different style modeled after famous people as Richard Nixon, Ronald Reagan or Lenin.

Reception 
Amiga Joker 2/94 magazine gave Pizza Connection 88 of 100%, Powerplay magazin rated the Amiga version 82 of 100%.

Next Generation reviewed the PC version of the game, rating it four stars out of five, and stated that "Not a game for die hard action fans, but a winner for just about everyone else."

In 1996, Computer Gaming World declared Pizza Tycoon the 34th-worst computer game ever released.

Legacy
Pizza Tycoon (Pizza Connection) was followed by Fast Food Tycoon (Pizza Syndicate), and Fast Food Tycoon 2 (Pizza Connection 2), developed by Software 2000. A fourth game, Pizza Connection 3 was developed by Gentlymad Studios in 2018.

Pizza Connection 1 & 2 were released on GOG.com in January 2017.

See also
Transport Tycoon

References

External links
Pizza Tycoon at MobyGames
Pizza Tycoon Page Unofficial fan page
Terry Greer's Microprose Misc graphics page Page the Microprose artist who worked on the conversion from the original German game.

1994 video games
Amiga games
Business simulation games
DOS games
Linux games
MacOS games
MicroProse games
Multiplayer and single-player video games
Organized crime video games
Software 2000 games
Video games about food and drink
Video games developed in Germany
Windows games